Pittwater High School, (abbreviation PHS) is a school located in Mona Vale, New South Wales, Australia, on Mona Street and Pittwater Road. It is a co-educational high school operated by the New South Wales Department of Education with students from years 7 to 12. The school was established in 1963.

History and name
Pittwater High School was established in 1963. It is named after Pittwater, the body of water extending south from Broken Bay parallel to the coast. The waterway was surveyed by crew members of HMS Sirius in 1788, and named "Pitt Water" after British Prime Minister William Pitt the Younger.

Due to its location the school has a rich sporting history, producing many Olympians, especially in both swimming and sailing, and for many years had its own yacht, "Kalori", which was built and sailed by students and staff.

The school also has a strong musical tradition, with internationally renowned jazz musician James Morrison and his brother John Morrison both students at the school in the 1970s, along with the children of Australian rock singer Johnny O'Keefe and Keith Potger of the Seekers. The school has been involved in the Rock Eisteddfod Challenge since its inception in the early 1980s, winning the 1987 Sydney challenge, despite a disastrous school fire the night before the final.

In August 1986, the school's Binishell Dome collapsed after a PDHPE lesson due to errors in the curing process. This caused a decline in popularity of Binishells across NSW public schools.

PHS joined the Peninsula Community of Schools in 2008. The uniform is also used on the Seven Network TV show Home and Away. PHS is the sister school of New Trier High School in Chicago, America.

Notable alumni

Kirk Baxter – film editor
Colin Beashel – member of the crew of Australia II (1983 America's Cup winning yacht), and 8 times Olympian
Tom Burlinson – actor and singer
Tom Carroll – twice Professional World Surfing champion
Rodney Clarke – senior Australian ice dance champion and Olympian
Tess Haubrich – actress and model
Andrew Lloyd – Olympic runner and Commonwealth Games gold medallist
James Morrison – musician
John Morrison – musician
Georgina Parkes – Olympic swimmer and Commonwealth Games gold medallist
Kerryn Phelps – former AMA President, professor
Peter Phelps – actor, father
Courtney Barnett - musician
James Spithill – yachtsman and twice America's Cup winning skipper
Rebecca Lacey – actress
Tom Trbojevic – rugby league player for the Manly-Warringah Sea Eagles
Jake Trbojevic - rugby league for the Manly-Warringah Sea Eagles
Shane Fitzsimmons – Commissioner of the New South Wales Rural Fire Service; 2021 NSW Australian of the Year.
Michael Stead – Bishop of South Sydney, Anglican Church Diocese of Sydney
Jason Waterhouse – sailor, Australian Sailing Team: Mixed Multihull – Nacra 17 – Rio Olympics 2016

See also 
 List of Government schools in New South Wales
 Electoral district of Pittwater
 Division of Mackellar
 Pittwater Council

References

External links 
 Pittwater High School website

Public high schools in Sydney
Rock Eisteddfod Challenge participants
Educational institutions established in 1963
1963 establishments in Australia
Northern Beaches